San Marino is not a member of the European Union or European Economic Area. However, it maintains an open border with Italy. Since San Marino is only accessible via Italy entrance is not possible without entering the Schengen Area first and therefore Schengen visa rules apply de facto. Foreign visitors staying more than 10 days in San Marino must have a permit from the government.

Bilateral agreements

San Marino however signs independent visa-free agreements which are of symbolic value for foreign citizens but do have effect on San Marino passport holders. San Marino has signed such visa-free agreements with Argentina, Austria, Bosnia and Herzegovina, Bulgaria, China, Finland, Hungary, Japan, Kenya, Latvia, Lithuania, Morocco, Portugal, Romania, Russia, Slovenia, South Korea and the United Kingdom for ordinary passport holders. In addition, agreements were also signed with Azerbaijan, Gambia, Moldova, Eswatini, Tunisia, Turkey, and Uganda for diplomatic and service passport holders.

Passport stamps
When visiting San Marino, there is no passport control, hence no passport stamps are issued. However, visitors may get souvenir passport stamps at a state tourism office, which is considered by the authorities to be the official stamp.

See also

Visa requirements for Sammarinese citizens
Visa policy of the Schengen Area
List of diplomatic missions of San Marino
Foreign relations of San Marino
Tourism in San Marino

References

Foreign relations of San Marino
San Marino